Whale Music is a 1992 studio album by Canadian rock band Rheostatics. It should not be confused with the soundtrack to the film Whale Music, which was also composed by the band and released in 1994.

A performance from their concert tour to support this album was released in 2005 as The Whale Music Concert, 1992, a download-only album from Zunior Records.

The album cover is part of a painting by guitarist Martin Tielli.

Honours

In 1996, the Canadian music magazine Chart conducted a reader poll to determine the greatest Canadian albums of all time. Whale Music placed fifth in that poll, behind only Sloan, Joni Mitchell, Neil Young and The Tragically Hip. When the magazine conducted a follow-up poll in 2000, Whale Music placed fourth behind Mitchell, Young and Sloan, and was followed in fifth by the band's 1991 album Melville. In the magazine's third poll in 2005, Whale Music placed tenth. It is one of six albums to have ranked in the top ten in all three polls.

It was ranked 19th in Bob Mersereau's 2007 book The Top 100 Canadian Albums.

Covers
Barenaked Ladies, who had been guest musicians on the album, also covered "Legal Age Life at Variety Store" on the 2007 Rheostatics tribute album The Secret Sessions. Their version also included guest performers Jason Plumb and Tim Mech. On the same album, The Inbreds covered "Dope Fiends and Boozehounds" and By Divine Right covered "Shaved Head".

Track listing

Personnel
Dave Allen (credited on some tracks as "De Vallion String Quartet") – strings, violin, backing vocals
Barenaked Ladies (credited as "Scarborough Naked Youth Choir") – chorus
Joey Bechta – tambourine, backing vocals
Dave Bidini – bass, guitar, rhythm guitar, vocals
Chris Brown – organ, piano, trombone
Richard Burgmann – power tools
Dave Clark – percussion, drums, vocals, power tools, alarm clock
Matt DeMatteo – producer, engineer, power tools
Kevin Gould – arranger
Gene Hardy – saxophone
Ormond Jobin – producer, engineer
Tim Martin – accordion, vocals
Tim Mech – electric guitar
Lewis Melville – banjo, pedal steel, electric guitar, steel guitar
Peter Moore – mastering
Michael Phillip Wojewoda – guitar, tambourine, backing vocals, Egg shaker, Moog synthesizer
Neil Peart – percussion, arranger, drums
Pyramid of Stupidity Singers – vocals
The Raindrops – backing vocals
Tannis Slimmon – backing vocals
James Stewart – producer, engineer
Martin Tielli – guitar, vocals
Dutch Toko – classical guitar
Tim Vesely – acoustic guitar, bass, guitar, percussion, piano, accordion, vocals, string arrangements, power tools, mini moog

References

1992 albums
Rheostatics albums
Capitol Records albums